Edouard Guillaume Eugène Reuss (18 July 180415 April 1891) was a Protestant theologian from Alsace.

Life

He was born at Strasbourg, where he studied philology (1819–22). He went on to study theology at Göttingen under Johann Gottfried Eichhorn; and Oriental Languages at Halle under Wilhelm Gesenius, and afterwards at Paris under Silvestre de Sacy (1827–28). In 1828 he became Privatdozent at Strasbourg. From 1829 to 1834 he taught Biblical criticism and Oriental languages at the Strasbourg Theological School; he then became assistant, and afterwards, in 1836, regular professor of theology at that university. He became Professor of Old Testament at the same institution in 1864. Reuss was appointed as a regular member of the Deutsche Morgenländische Gesellschaft in May 1846. The sympathies of Reuss were German rather than French, and after the annexation of Alsace to Germany he remained at Strasbourg, and retained his professorship till he retired on a pension in 1888. He died in the same city.

Reuss belonged to the liberals in the Lutheran Protestant Church of Augsburg Confession of Alsace and Lorraine. His critical position was to some extent that of K. H. Graf and Julius Wellhausen: he was in a sense their forerunner, and was actually for a time Graf's teacher. The originator of the new movement, he hesitated to publish the results of his studies.

His son, Ernst Rudolf (1841–1924), was in 1873 appointed city librarian at Strasbourg.

Works

Amongst his earliest works were: De libris veteris Testamenti apocryphis plebi non negandis (1829), Ideen zur Einleitung in das Evangelium Johannis (1840) and Die Johanneische Theologie (1847). In 1852 he published his Histoire de la théologie chrétienne au siècle apostolique, which was followed in 1863 by L'Histoire du canon des saintes écritures dans l'église chrétienne. In 1874 he began to publish his translation of the Bible, La Bible, nouvelle traduction avec commentaire. New Testament criticism and exegesis formed the subject of Reuss's earlier labours—in 1842, he had published in German a history of the books of the New Testament, Geschichte der heiligen Schriften N. Test.; and though his own views were liberal, he opposed those of the Tübingen school. After a time he turned his attention to Old Testament criticism, based on knowledge of Hebrew. In 1881 he published in German his Geschichte der heiligen Schriften A. Test., a history of Israel from its earliest beginning till the taking of Jerusalem by Titus.

For many years Reuss edited with A. H. Cunitz the Beiträge zu den theologischen Wissenschaften. With A. H. Cunitz and J. W. Baum (1809–1878), and after their death alone, he edited the monumental edition of Calvin's works (38 vols., 1863 ff.). His critical edition of the Old Testament appeared a year after his death.

Notes

References 
 
 Article in Herzog-Hauck, Realencyklopädie
 Otto Pfleiderer, Development of Theology in Germany since Kant (1890).
 

1804 births
1891 deaths
Academic staff of the University of Strasbourg
19th-century German Protestant theologians
German biblical scholars
Old Testament scholars
New Testament scholars
19th-century German male writers
German male non-fiction writers